Eugene Franklin Shell (April 16, 1930 – October 8, 2020) was an American baseball, basketball, and football coach. He played college baseball and college basketball at Northeastern State and Southwestern Oklahoma State. He then served as the head baseball coach of the Tulsa Golden Hurricane from 1966 to 1980, leading the Golden Hurricane to a second-place finish in the 1969 College World Series. He also was the head baseball coach of the Southwestern Louisiana Ragin' Cajuns (1985–1987).

Early life
Shell attended Central High School and Webster High School in Tulsa, Oklahoma.

Coaching career
Shell was head baseball coach at Edison Preparatory School, Webster High School and Claremore High School, where he won five state championships. In 1965, Shell was hired to be an assistant football coach for Tulsa. He was asked to be an assistant basketball coach as well before he was offered the position of head baseball coach.

Shell died on October 8, 2020.

Head coaching record

References

1930 births
2020 deaths
Northeastern State RiverHawks men's basketball players
Northeastern State RiverHawks baseball players
Southwestern Oklahoma State Bulldogs men's basketball players
Southwestern Oklahoma State Bulldogs baseball players
High school football coaches in Oklahoma
Tulsa Golden Hurricane baseball coaches
Tulsa Golden Hurricane men's basketball coaches
Tulsa Golden Hurricane football coaches
Sportspeople from Oklahoma
Baseball coaches from Oklahoma
Baseball players from Oklahoma
Louisiana Ragin' Cajuns baseball coaches